Jules Halfant (June 23, 1909 in New York City, New York – May 5, 2001 in Berkeley Heights, New Jersey) was an American painter and printmaker.<ref name=dm>The Art of Jules Halfant. 60 Years of American Art", by Deborah Matlack, Art Museum of Los Gatos, Los Gatos, CA, 1999</ref> He is notable as a Federal Art Project (FAP) artist during the Great Depression of the 1930s in both mural and easel categories of the New York Works Progress Administration (WPA).Davenport's Art Reference. The Gold Edition, Davenport, Ray (Editor), Davenport Publishing, 2005 While in the WPA, he worked alongside such well-known artists as Jackson Pollock, Mark Rothko, Milton Avery and Stuart Davis. From 1953 to 1988 Jules Halfant was Art Director of Vanguard Records where he designed albums featuring Joan Baez, Tom Paxton, Country Joe and the Fish, Buffy Sainte-Marie and many other musicians.

While attending high school in Brooklyn, New York with Jacob Kainen, Jules submitted his drawings to the National Academy of Design in New York at age of fourteen. He was accepted as a student and studied there in 1924-1927. During the 1930s and 1940s, Jules Halfant created hundreds of paintings depicting street scenes of New York City. He provided the illustrations for Jazz, A People's Music, a 1948 study by Marxist art critic Sidney Finkelstein. Halfant painted his neighbors, parents, friends, shopkeepers, pushcart vendors. Beginning in the 1950s, the artist started to focus on painting Jewish religious and cultural life. He got inspiration from works of great Jewish authors (Dybbuk by S. Ansky, Tevye by Sholem Aleichem, Three Wishes by I. L. Peretz), Biblical stories as well from visiting synagogues where he depicted different aspects of the services and holidays observances. In 1963, Jules Halfant designed the Bob Dylan New York City Town Hall Concert poster.

Collections
Brooklyn Museum, New York City, New York
Smithsonian American Art Museum, Washington, D.C.
Wolfsonian–Florida International University, Miami Beach, Florida, The Mitchell Wolfson Jr. Collection

Discography (Visual)

Joan Baez - Joan Baez ◄ (5 versions) Vanguard 1960
Doc Watson - Doc Watson Vanguard 1964
John Hammond - Big City Blues (LP, Album, Mono) Vanguard  1964
Joan Baez - Farewell, Angelina ◄ (4 versions) Vanguard 1965
Buffy Sainte-Marie - Little Wheel Spin and Spin ◄ (4 versions) Vanguard 1966
Perrey - Kingsley* - The In Sound from Way Out! ◄ (3 versions) Vanguard 1966
The Serpent Power - The Serpent Power Vanguard 1967
Doc Watson - Home Again! ◄ (2 versions) Fontana 1967
The Siegel-Schwall Band - Say Siegel-Schwall ◄ (2 versions) Vanguard 1967
Mississippi John Hurt - The Immortal Mississippi John Hurt ◄ (3 versions) Vanguard 1967
Circus Maximus - Circus Maximus Vanguard 1967
Charley Musselwhite - Stand Back! Here Comes Charley Musselwhite's South Side Band Vanguard 1967
Country Joe and the Fish - Electric Music for the Mind and Body ◄ (3 versions) Vanguard 1967
Listening - Listening ◄ (2 versions) Vanguard 1968
Elizabeth - Elizabeth Vanguard 1968
Joan Baez - Baptism Vanguard 1968
Peter Walker - "Second Poem To Karmela" Or Gypsies Are Important (LP) Vanguard 1968
Rev. Gary Davis - The Reverend Gary Davis at Newport (LP) Vanguard 1968
Circus Maximus - Neverland Revisited (LP, Album) Vanguard 1968
Junior Wells - Coming At You (LP, Album) Vanguard 1968
Joan Baez - David's Album Vanguard 1969
Country Joe & the Fish - Greatest Hits Vanguard 1969
Joan Baez - Joan Baez Vol. 2 ◄ (3 versions) Vanguard 1969
Ferre Grignard - Captain Disaster Major Minor, Barclay 1970
Wildweeds - Wildweeds (LP, Album) Vanguard 1970
Buffy Sainte-Marie - She Used to Wanna Be a Ballerina ◄ (2 versions) Vanguard 1971
Country Joe and the Fish - The Life and Times of Country Joe and the Fish from Haight-Ashbury to Woodstock ◄ (3 versions) Vanguard 1971
Zager & Evans - Food for the Mind (LP, Album) Vanguard 1971
Mimi & Richard Fariña - The Best of Mimi & Richard Fariña (2xLP, Comp) Vanguard 1971
Al Anderson - Al Anderson (LP, Album) Vanguard 1972
Mississippi John Hurt - Last Sessions ◄ (2 versions) Vanguard 1972
Oregon - Music of Another Present Era ◄ (3 versions) Vanguard 1972
Larry Coryell - Offering ◄ (4 versions) Vanguard, Vanguard 1972
Various - The Greatest Songs of Woody Guthrie ◄ (2 versions) Vanguard 1972
Buffy Sainte-Marie - Moonshot ◄ (8 versions) Vanguard 1972
Various - Greatest Folksingers of the Sixties Vanguard 1972	
Buffy Sainte-Marie - Quiet Places ◄ (4 versions) Vanguard 1973
Country Joe McDonald - Paris Sessions Vanguard, Vanguard 1973
Sivuca - Sivuca ◄ (2 versions) Vanguard 1973
Larry Coryell - The Real Great Escape ◄ (2 versions) Vanguard 1973	
P.D.Q. Bach - The Intimate P.D.Q. Bach (LP, Gat) Vanguard, Vanguard 1973	
Larry Coryell - Planet End Vanguard 1975
Big Mama Thornton - Sassy Mama! ◄ (2 versions) Vanguard 1975
Larry Coryell - The Restful Mind ◄ (2 versions) Vanguard 1975	
Sivuca - Live at the Village Gate (LP) Vanguard 1975	
The Pazant Bros. & the Beaufort Express - Loose and Juicy (LP, Album) Vanguard, Vanguard 1975
Camille Yarbrough - The Iron Pot Cooker (LP, Album) Vanguard 1975	
Joan Baez - The Joan Baez Lovesong Album (2xLP, Comp, Gat) Vanguard 1976	
The Players' Association - The Players' Association Vanguard 1977	
Elvin Jones, James Moody, Clark Terry, Bunky Green, Roland Prince - Summit Meeting ◄ (3 versions) Vanguard 1977	
The Players Association - Born to Dance ◄ (2 versions) Vanguard 1977
The Players Association - Turn The Music Up! Vanguard, Vanguard 1979
The Players Association - We Got the Groove! Vanguard, Vanguard 1980	
Roni Griffith - Roni Griffith ◄ (2 versions) Vanguard 1982	
Roni Griffith - (The Best Part of) Breakin' Up / Desire Vanguard 1982	
P.D.Q. Bach - A Little Nightmare Music ◄ (2 versions) Vanguard 1983	
Bert Jansch with John Renbourn - Jack Orion Vanguard 1991	
Eric Andersen - Bout Changes & Things Vanguard 1993	
Carl Oglesby - Carl Oglesby / Going to Damascus (CD, Comp) Universe (3), Vanguard 2003	
Doc Watson - Southbound Cisco Music 2005	
John Hammond - So Many Roads Vanguard 2011	
Eric Andersen - More Hits from Tin Can Alley Vanguard, Comet Records (2) Year unknown	
Baldwin and Leps - Baldwin and Leps Vanguard, Comet Records (2) Year unknown	
Oregon - Friends ◄ (2 versions) Vanguard Year unknown
Joan Baez - In Concert'' (2xLP) Vanguard Year unknown

References 

1909 births
2001 deaths
Painters from New York City
20th-century American painters
American male painters
National Academy of Design members
Federal Art Project artists
20th-century American printmakers
20th-century American male artists